The Garissa–Nuno–Modogashe–Wajir Road is a road in Kenya, connecting the towns of Garissa, Nuno, Modogashe and Wajir.

Location
The road starts at Garissa, Garissa County, on the Nairobi–Thika–Garissa–Dadaab–Liboi Road.

Overview
This road, is an important trade corridor for traffic headed from Nairobi to Ethiopia via Moyale or Rhamu. Together with the proposed Garsen–Witu–Lamu Highway, is a component of the Lamu-Moyale Highway, part of LAPSSET.

Upgrade and funding
The government of Kenya upgraded the first  of this road, using locally sourced funds. The government then approached the oil-rich  Arab countries for loans to upgrade the  Nuno–Modogashe section at an estimated cost Sh13.4 billion (approx. US$134.5 million). In March 2013, government received loans and grants from (a) the Kuwait Fund (b) the OPEC Fund (c) the Saudi Fund (d) the Abu Dhabi Fund and the Arab Bank for Economic Development in Africa, to fund the upgrade of the Nuno–Modogashe Road.

The construction work was contracted to Arab Contractors Limited of Egypt. Work was expected to start in 2015 and conclude in 2017.

See also
 List of roads in Kenya
 LAPSSET

References

External links
 Webpage of the Kenya National Highway Authority
 US$517m Kenya-Ethiopia highway scheduled for completion in 2015

Roads in Kenya
Geography of Kenya
Transport in Kenya
Garissa County
Isiolo County
Wajir County